Power politics is a theory of power in international relations which contends that distributions of power and national interests, or changes to those distributions, are fundamental causes of war and of system stability.

The concept of power politics provides a way of understanding systems of international relations: in this view, states compete for the world's limited resources, and it is to an individual state's advantage to be manifestly able to harm others. Power politics prioritizes national self-interest over the interests of other nations or the international community, and thus may include threatening one another with military, economic, or political aggression to protect one nation's own interest.

Techniques of power politics include:

 Deterrence theory, in which a weaker state deters attack by bolstering its defensive capabilities enough to render attacking infeasible
 Conspicuous weapons development (including nuclear development)
 Pre-emptive strikes
 Blackmail
 The massing of military units on a border, whether for stationing or for exercises
 The imposition of tariffs or economic sanctions (possibly to initiate a trade war)
 Proxy warfare
 Bait and bleed and "bloodletting" tactics
 Hard and soft balancing
 Buck-passing, in which a state attempts to coerce another state to confront a threat, in order to preserve its own capabilities and possibly intervene later
 The use of espionage to subvert another state's capabilities from within
 Covert and clandestine military operations, in which states obscure their role in an operation or conduct the operation in secret, respectively
 Shock and awe, in which a state uses a real (or played-up) show of force to deter potential attack
 Asymmetric warfare, in which a state uses unconventional warfare methods in order to exploit another's weaknesses
 Propaganda, in which a state or its agencies use adverse inaccurate information to weaken another's reputation.

Literature
 
 Hans Köchler, "The United Nations Organization and Global Power Politics: The Antagonism between Power and Law and the Future of World Order," in: Chinese Journal of International Law, Vol. 5, No. 2 (2006), pp. 323–340. ABSTRACT
 Michael Mann, The Sources of Social Power, voll. 1–4, Cambridge University Press, Cambridge-New York, 1986–2012.
 John Mearsheimer, The Tragedy of Great Power Politics. New York: W.W. Norton & Company, 2001.
 Hans J. Morgenthau, Scientific Man vs. Power Politics. Chicago: The University of Chicago Press, 1946.
 —, Politics Among Nations: The Struggle for Power and Peace. New York NY: Alfred A. Knopf, 1948.
 Geoff Mulgan, Good and Bad Power, Penguin, 2005.
 Martin Wight, Power Politics, 2nd ed., Pelican Books, 1979.

See also
 Great power
 Colonialism
 Expansionism
 Global policeman
 Ideocracy
 Imperialism
 Political realism
 Power (social and political)
 Power harassment another's 
 Power Politics (Wight book) 
 Realpolitik
 Resource curse
 State collapse
 The Anatomy of Power
 American exceptionalism

References

Political terminology
Political realism
Power (social and political) theories